Abdullah Al-Matroushi (Arabic:عبد الله المطروشي) (born 18 July 1993) is an Emirati footballer who plays as a defender.

References

External links
 

Emirati footballers
1993 births
Living people
Al-Ittihad Kalba SC players
Al Urooba Club players
Fujairah FC players
Al Bataeh Club players
Association football defenders
Place of birth missing (living people)
UAE First Division League players
UAE Pro League players